This is a list of electoral results for the electoral district of Balonne in Queensland state elections.

Members for Balonne

Election results

Elections in the 1980s
The results for the 1989 election were:

Elections in the 1970s

Elections in the 1960s

Elections in the 1950s

Elections in the 1920s

Elections in the 1910s

References

Queensland state electoral results by district